The Limestone Hills are a group of hills in northeast Lincoln County, Nevada. They lie adjacent to the north end of the Wilson Creek–White Rock ranges and the old mining camp of Atlanta. The Snake Range and White Pine County lie  to the north. The Fortification Range lies to the northwest.

References 

Mountain ranges of Nevada
Mountain ranges of the Great Basin
Mountain ranges of Lincoln County, Nevada